Littledean Hall is a country house in the village of Littledean, Gloucestershire, England. It has been described as one of the most haunted houses in England and is thought to be the oldest house in the United Kingdom which is still occupied. Saxon and Celtic remains have been uncovered in the cellars. Part of the house is designated an SSSI as it is a proven breeding roost for the Greater Horseshoe Bat (Rhinolophus ferrumequinum).

Architecture and History

Originally a Saxon hall, then a church, it was then converted to a Norman hall, complete with a crypt and undercroft. Testing has shown that these remains date back to the 5th century. However, when records began of the house in 1080, it had evolved into a substantial medieval manor house which was eventually replaced with a Jacobean house in 1612.

The hall has seven bedrooms, a coach house, a dining room, sitting and drawing rooms, a stable, living room and cellar. The sweet chestnuts (Castanea sativa) which line the driveway are at least 500 years old and the remains of a Roman road have been found underneath the drive itself.

In 2007 the building suffered damage after lightning struck nearby and in 2008 the owners of the hall were ordered to rebuild a section of wall they had knocked down. The wall was deemed to be a Grade II listed building alongside the main hall.

Reports of hauntings
There are at least three distinct tales which have been said to have led to hauntings at Littledean Hall. The first being the deaths of Colonel Congreve and Colonel Wigmore, who both died when the Kings garrison met with roundheads in the dining room. It is reported that visitors can still see the bloodstains where they fell.

In 1741 Charles Pyrke, former occupant of the house, was accused of raping the sister of his servant. The servant promptly murdered Pyrke before being put to death himself. The servant's ghost is thought by some to haunt the hall to this day and it has been reported to be carrying a candle. Two other Pyrke brothers are said to wander the halls, having killed each other in a duel in 1740.

Dean Hall Coach House & Cellar SSSI

Dean Hall Coach House & Cellar is a  biological Site of Special Scientific Interest in Gloucestershire, notified in 1988. The site is listed in the 'Forest of Dean Local Plan Review' as a Key Wildlife Site (KWS).

The hall (coach house and cellar) is currently home to Greater horseshoe bats which makes it a Site of Special Scientific Interest which is closely monitored by Natural England. It is a significant breeding roost and its use has been recorded since 1986.  Local reports indicated that bats may have used the building for over 75 years.

Location and habitat
The site is one of a series of Sites of Special Scientific Interest within the Forest of Dean and Wye Valley (Gloucestershire and Monmouthshire).  These sites support (between them) breeding and hibernation roosts for Lesser and Greater horseshoe bats.  This is of European importance. Other sites in the group in Gloucestershire (all of which are SSSIs) include the breeding sites of Blaisdon Hall, Caerwood And Ashberry Goose House, and Sylvan House Barn.  Hibernation sites include Buckshraft Mine & Bradley Hill Railway Tunnel, Devil's Chapel Scowles, Old Bow And Old Ham Mines and Westbury Brook Ironstone Mine.

The deciduous woodlands and sheltered valleys of the Forest of Dean and the Wye Valley provide a good feeding area, and the underground systems provide roosting and breeding sites. A ring of iron-ore bearing Carboniferous Limestone in the Forest of Dean has created a series of ancient and more recent mines which provide hibernation sites. The citations for the series of sites provide common information.

Wye Valley and Forest of Dean Bat Sites/ Safleoedd Ystlumod Dyffryn Gwy a Fforest y Ddena are recognised as a Special Area of Conservation (SAC) under the EU Habitats Directive.

References

External links
 Natural England (SSSI information)

Sites of Special Scientific Interest in Gloucestershire
Sites of Special Scientific Interest notified in 1988
Forest of Dean